Rotem Sela  is an Israeli model, actress and television presenter best-known for playing Noa Hollander on the hit TV-show Beauty and the Baker (2013–2021).

Early life
Sela was born in Kiryat Haim, Israel, to Jewish parents. Her mother Liora ( Shaulsky) is Israeli-born and of Ashkenazi Jewish (Polish-Jewish) descent, and her father Avraham Sela is a fourth-generation Sabra (Israeli-born Jew). She moved with her family to the affluent city of Caesarea, Israel, when Sela was 17. Her common Hebrew first name is a derivative of the biblical desert shrub Retama, while her surname means "a rock" in Hebrew.

She was enlisted to the Israel Defense Forces, serving as a clerk for the Navy headquarters at HaKirya base.

She graduated in 2011 with a degree in law and business administration from the IDC Herzliya college in Herzliya, Israel, and passed the bar.

Career
Sela has said that she prioritises having a career in Israel instead of pursuing opportunities elsewhere; “Tel Aviv cannot be replaced by any city in the world. It’s always surprising to people, but it’s really not my dream to succeed in America, I want to succeed here, to work here, to do Israeli work…it was important to me to stay here.”

As a model she currently fronts the Castro campaigns alongside Aviv Alush. 

In 2013 she was cast as the female lead in Beauty and the Baker alongside Alush after Bar Refaeli exited the role. Sela plays Noa Hollander a privileged Ashkenazi model and heiress that falls in love with a working-class Yemenite baker Amos Dahari (Alush). The series was positively reviewed by Haaretz newspaper. In 2017 Amazon acquired global rights of the first two seasons of the show to stream them worldwide on Amazon Prime Video.

In 2018 she was cast as a series regular in The Psychologist, an Israeli Public Broadcasting Corporation show that follows a similar format to the Lisa Kudrow series, Web Therapy. In the same year Sela appeared alongside Assi Cohen as a Haredi housewife in Autonomies. Autonomies is a dystopian drama about an Israel divided into two entities; the Haredi Autonomy in Jerusalem and a secular State of Israel in Tel Aviv.

Personal life
In 2010 she married Israeli businessman Ariel Rotter, with whom she has three children.

Sela became a vegetarian in 2007 and then began to approach veganism as well. In an interview with the Pnai Plus newspaper in November 2015, she defined herself as "90% vegan". In 2014, she participated in a broadcast by the Vegan Friendly organization, which opposes the harm to cows in the dairy industry and calls for avoiding the consumption of dairy products. 

In March 2019, Sela criticized culture minister Miri Regev's reaction to Arab political parties in Israel. Sela wrote that Prime Minister Benjamin Netanyahu then responded directly to Sela's post and brought attention to the Basic Law: Israel as the Nation-State of the Jewish People. Sela was publicly supported by several Israeli figures, including Hollywood actress Gal Gadot, model Shlomit Malka, and Arab-Israeli newscaster Lucy Aharish.

Sela has supported LGBT rights, telling Ynet in 2015 that "I would give Nora Grinberg a torch, she's among the first [openly] transgender people in Israel, and it's very important that gays, lesbians and transgenders get a stage." And when asked whether the #MeToo movement had become too extreme she replied that "The situation before the #MeToo movement was extreme, this world in which men allowed themselves to talk and behave to women in an uninhibited way. The campaign is very important, and even if at the moment it feels to some people too extreme, it is okay and eventually the middle will be found."

Filmography

See also
List of Israelis

References

External links

Rotem Sela at the Fashion Model Directory

1983 births
Living people
21st-century Israeli actresses
Israeli female models
Israeli film actresses
Israeli people of Polish-Jewish descent
Israeli Ashkenazi Jews
Israeli television actresses
Israeli television presenters
Jewish Israeli actresses
Jewish female models
Israeli LGBT rights activists
Israeli women television presenters